KSRO (1350 AM) is a commercial radio station broadcasting a news/talk radio format. KSRO is licensed to Santa Rosa, California, and serves the Sonoma County area.  The station is owned by Lawrence Amaturo, through licensee Amaturo Sonoma Media Group, LLC.  

By day, KSRO transmits 5,000 watts non-directional, but at night, to protect other stations from interference, it uses a directional antenna with a two-tower array.  The transmitter is off Stony Point Road in Santa Rosa.  KSRO programming is also heard on three FM translators: K278CD, broadcasting at 103.5 MHz in Santa Rosa.  And 94.5 K233CM and 96.9 K245DJ in Petaluma.

Programming
KSRO features national talk programs, mostly from Premiere Networks and Westwood One.  Nationally syndicated shows include The Ramsey Show with Dave Ramsey, The Clay Travis and Buck Sexton Show, The Guy Benson Show, Ground Zero with Clyde Lewis, Coast to Coast AM with George Noory and America in The Morning.  News from ABC News Radio begins most hours.

KSRO airs a local weekday wake-up news and information show, "Sonoma County's Morning News with Michelle Marques".  In the afternoon, "The Drive with Steve Jaxon" is heard, Sonoma County's only local weekday talk show. The Drive features interviews with newsmakers, musicians, authors, and comedians.  In 2012, The Drive's weekly "California Wine Country" segment was the winner of "Best Critic or Review Series" at the 2015 Taste Awards, and has been a multiple-time nominee for Best Food or Drink Radio Broadcast.  Weekends feature programs on food and wine, real estate, money, gardening and home repair.  Syndicated weekend hosts include Kim Komando, Ken Coleman, "Somewhere in Time with Art Bell," and "On The House With The Carey Brothers."  Saturday Mornings features the long running Garden Talk and the Good Food Hour.  Sundays feature the Mike Kelly Real Estate Show with Allison Norman.  

Live sports broadcasts on KSRO include the Las Vegas Raiders and the Golden State Warriors.  In the fall, high school football games are broadcast.

History
Though predated by short-lived KFNV, KSRO is the oldest station in Santa Rosa still broadcasting. In May 1937, KSRO first signed on.  The station was founded by Ernest L. Finley, owner of the Santa Rosa Press Democrat. The ownership of the station passed to Finley's wife Ruth, when he died in 1942.  The station achieved some fame in 1943, when an actual broadcast was included in Alfred Hitchcock's film Shadow of a Doubt, filmed on location in Santa Rosa.

KSRO began broadcasting Santa Rosa Junior College football games in 1939, when the school joined the Northern California Junior College Conference. This initiated a fifty-year relationship.

In the 1950s and 1960s, KSRO played Top 40 music.  Its strong signal carried through the mountainous regions of the county. It was one of the few stations that could be received in the Russian River resort area.  Like many AM stations, the increasing popularity of FM radio resulted in KSRO's change of format, first to middle of the road (MOR) music with talk and news, and then to all talk and news. In 2020, KSRO became the Bay Area station for broadcasts of Las Vegas Raiders games.

References

External links
FCC History Cards for KSRO

Mass media in Sonoma County, California
News and talk radio stations in the United States
SRO
Mass media in Santa Rosa, California